Commercial aviation is the part of civil aviation that involves operating aircraft for remuneration or hire, as opposed to private aviation.

Definition
Commercial aviation is not a rigorously defined category. All commercial air transport and aerial work operations are regarded as commercial aviation, as well as some general aviation flights.

Commercial air transport is defined as an aircraft operation involving the transport of passengers, cargo or mail for remuneration or hire. It includes scheduled and non-scheduled air transport operations. Aerial work is defined as an aircraft operation in which an aircraft is used for specialized services such as agriculture, construction, photography, surveying, observation and patrol, search and rescue, advertisement, etc. General aviation includes commercial activities such as flight instruction, aerial work, and corporate and business aviation, as well as non-commercial activities such as recreational flying.

Most commercial aviation activities require at minimum a commercial pilot licence, and some require an airline transport pilot licence (ATPL). In the US, the pilot in command of a scheduled air carriers' aircraft must hold an ATPL. In the UK, pilots must hold an ATPL before they be pilot in command of an aircraft with 9 or more passenger seats.

Not all activities involving pilot remuneration require a commercial pilot licence. For example, in European Union Aviation Safety Agency states and the UK it is possible to become a paid flight instructor with only a private pilot licence. Nonetheless, in the UK, flight instruction is considered a commercial operation.

It is the purpose of the flight, not the aircraft or pilot, that determines whether the flight is commercial or private. For example, if a commercially licensed pilot flies a plane to visit a friend or attend a business meeting, this would be a private flight. Conversely, a private pilot could legally fly a multi-engine complex aircraft carrying passengers for non-commercial purposes (no compensation paid to the pilot, and a pro rata or larger portion of the aircraft operating expenses paid by the pilot).

History

United States

Origins

Harry Bruno and Juan Trippe were early promoters of commercial aviation.

The Air Commerce Act of 1926 began to regularize commercial aviation by establishing standards, facilitation, and promotion. An Aeronautical Branch was established in the Department of Commerce with William P. MacCracken Jr. as director. To promote commercial aviation, he told town fathers that "Communities without airports would be communities without airmail."

Writing for Collier's in 1929, he noted "Commercial aviation is the first industry inspired by hero-worship and built upon heros". He cited the promotion in South America by Herbert Dargue in early 1927. After his 1927 trans-Atlantic flight, Charles Lindbergh made a tour of the contiguous United States, paid for by the Daniel Guggenheim Foundation for the Promotion of Aeronautics. From that point, commercial aviation took off:

Roads were choked on Sundays, for weeks afterward, by motorists trying to get to Lambert Field, Lindbergh's home port in Saint Louis, to buy their first air hop. Hundreds of thousands of you went aloft for the first time that summer.

The Aeronautical Branch was charged with issuing commercial pilot licenses, airworthiness certificates, and with investigating air accidents.

After 1945

After World War II, commercial aviation grew rapidly, using mostly ex-military aircraft to transport people and cargo. The experience used in designing heavy bombers such as the Boeing B-29 Superfortress and Avro Lancaster could be used for designing heavy commercial aircraft. The Douglas DC-3 also made for easier and longer commercial flights. The first commercial jet airliner to fly was the British de Havilland DH.106 Comet. By 1952, the British state airline British Overseas Airways Corporation had introduced the Comet into scheduled service. While a technical achievement, the plane suffered a series of highly public failures, as the shape of the windows led to cracks due to metal fatigue. The fatigue was caused by cycles of pressurization and depressurization of the cabin, and eventually led to catastrophic failure of the plane's fuselage. By the time the problems were overcome, other jet airliner designs had already taken to the skies.

Latin America

Pre-war 
Inspired by the major players such as the United States, the Soviet Union, Russia, France and Britain in the aviation industry. In the 1910s, Brazil and Argentina were among the first Latin American countries to possess the instruments of aircraft that were not all locally made, yet the aircraft was locally congregated. At that time, many individuals were interested to be pilots in Latin American countries, yet there were not sufficient resources and funding to support and promote the best interests of the aviation industry. Amidst these obstacles, Argentina and the Dominican Republic made efforts in creating jet aviation rather than creating and using propeller planes. In 1944, the Chicago Convention on International Civil Aviation attended by all Latin American countries except Argentina drafted the clauses of aviation law. The introduction of the jet fighter F-80 by the US in 1945 pushed the Latin American countries even further away from development of aviation industry because it was simply expensive to recreate the sophisticated technology of F-80.

Post-war 
The Latin American Civil Aviation Commission (LACAC) was formed in December 1973 "intended to provide civil aviation authorities in the region with an adequate framework for cooperation and coordination of activities related to civil aviation". In 1976, about seven percent of the world logged in the Latin American and Caribbean region. This contributed to the increase of average annual rate of air traffic. Subsequently, higher passenger load factor decided the profitability of these airlines.

According to C. Bogolasky, airline pooling agreements between Latin American airlines contributed to better financial performance of the airlines. The economic problems related to the "airline capacity regulation, regulation of non-scheduled operations, tariff enforcement, high operating costs, passenger and cargo rates."

Corporate social responsibility 

Corporate social responsibility comprises an umbrella of responsibilities of an organization towards its community, stakeholders and shareholders. Organizations who are socially responsible fulfill their triple bottom line obligations and dedicate efforts to minimize negative impact on stakeholders and shareholders. According to "The Pyramid of Corporate Social Responsibility" by Archie B. Carroll, there are four steps of social responsibility. First, economic responsibility of an organization is to produce profit and maximize the growth of an organization. Second, legal responsibility of an organization is to be compliant with all the laws and regulations. Third, ethical responsibility of an organization to create and follow standards of right decision-making considering how it affects all the stakeholders. Fourth, philanthropic responsibility of an organization to help the community and stakeholders by "giving back". The extent of fulfilling the four responsibilities defines the corporate citizenship of an organization.

Delta and LATAM Airlines were the only two airlines listed on the Dow Jones Sustainability Index, LATAM being the only airline company in the world to achieve 100% scores for efficiency, reliability and climate strategy in their corporate sustainability assessment. LATAM promotes their corporate citizenship in their 2016 Sustainability report. LATAM is affiliated with 6 countries which are Argentina, Colombia, Brazil, Ecuador, Chile, and Peru. LATAM accounts for 95% of South America's air traffic.

See also 

 Airliner
 Flight level
 Direct flight
 Domestic flight
 Environmental impact of aviation (including effects on climate change)
 International flight
 Mainline
 Non-stop flight
 Private aviation

References

External links
 Transport Canada Flight Test Guide – Commercial Pilot License – Aeroplane

Commercial aviation
Civil aviation